Buje is a town situated in Istria, Croatia's westernmost peninsula.

History

Buje has a rich history; traces of life in the region date back to prehistoric times. The town developed from a Roman and Venetian settlement into a medieval town. Buje was part of the Republic of Venice from 1358 until 1797, when the Treaty of Campo Formio handed it over to Austria. It was annexed by France after the Treaty of Schönbrunn in 1809 but restored to Austria at the Congress of Vienna in 1815. Buje passed to Italy at the end of World War I in 1918, where it remained until 1945. In 1947, it became part of the Free Territory of Trieste Zone B, which was administered by Yugoslavia. In October 1954, Zone B together with Buje was united with the Socialist Republic of Croatia, and remains part of independent Croatia today.

A Baroque style Church of Our Lady of Mercy from the 16th century, built on the foundations of an ancient Roman temple, dominates the central square. The old city was protected with stone fortifications, part of which have been preserved to modern times. With its narrow streets and a central square, the old town is a fine example of Medieval architecture with strong Venetian Renaissance architecture influences, as in the rest of the region.

After World War II Buje developed into an industrial, cultural, and economic center of this region of northwestern Croatia.

Geography 
The town is located in northwest Istria, 13 km from Umag. The town has an area of 103.28 km2.

Buje has become a modern regional center, and outside of the old town center a modern city has sprung. Despite its development, the city has retained some features from its historical periods.

Being situated on a hill, the old town section offers views of the surrounding scenery, dominated by Mediterranean flora, vineyards, and olive groves.

To its visitors today, Buje offers a blend of gentle Mediterranean climate, regional cuisine, and a quiet setting away from the more touristic Istrian coastal resorts.

Municipality 
The Town of Buje consists of 21 settlements.

Demographics 
The population of the whole administrative area of the Town of Buje is 5,182, with 2,671 in the titular settlement itself.

Languages 
According to the 1921 census, there were 7,431 Italians, 6 Croats, 8 Slovenes and 20 foreigners.

According to the 2011 census results, 58.39% of the town's population had the Croatian language as their mother tongue, and 33.25% had the Italian language.

Buje has a high number of Italians, and an Italian language school, the "Leonardo da Vinci". It was 50% Italian in 1991, when the town's limits included Grožnjan.

References

Further reading

External links 

   
 Tourist-croatia.com: Tourism in Buje —

Cities and towns in Croatia
Populated places in Istria County
Italian-speaking territorial units in Croatia